Charles Daulphin (born 15 September 1936, in Bermuda) is a former Bermudian cricketer. He was a right-handed batsman and a right-arm medium-pace bowler. He played one first-class match for Bermuda against New Zealand in 1972, scoring a half-century in Bermuda's second innings, the highest score for Bermuda in the match. This remained the only first-class half-century for Bermuda until 2004. It was also the maiden first-class match to be played by the Bermuda cricket team.

References

External links
Cricket Archive profile
Cricinfo profile

1936 births
Living people
Bermudian cricketers